The 2013 Asian Wrestling Championships were held at the  Indira Gandhi Sports Complex in New Delhi, India. The event took place from 18 to 22 April 2013.

Medal table

Team ranking

Medal summary

Men's freestyle

Men's Greco-Roman

Women's freestyle

Participating nations 
237 competitors from 20 nations competed.

 (21)
 (10)
 (21)
 (14)
 (6)
 (21)
 (3)
 (21)
 (18)
 (14)
 (7)
 (2)
 (21)
 (3)
 (8)
 (10)
 (6)
 (7)
 (15)
 (9)

References

External links
UWW Database

Asia
Asian Wrestling Championships
W
International wrestling competitions hosted by India